Lycastris albipes is a species of syrphid fly in the family Syrphidae.

Distribution
India.

References

Eristalinae
Insects described in 1857
Diptera of Asia
Taxa named by Francis Walker (entomologist)